AZS PSW Biała Podlaska is a Poish women's football club from Biała Podlaska.

The team plays in the highest league, the Ekstraliga Kobiet, the top level women's football league of Poland. The best result was getting a 4th place in 2007, 2009 and 2010.

Statistics

References

External links 

Women's football clubs in Poland
Biała Podlaska
Sport in Lublin Voivodeship
Association football clubs established in 2003
2003 establishments in Poland